Gongshang University Yunbin (Chinese: 工商大学云滨) is a metro station on Line 8 of the Hangzhou Metro in China. Opened on 28 June 2021, it is located on the west bank of Qiantang River, in the Qiantang District of Hangzhou.

References 

Hangzhou Metro stations
Railway stations in China opened in 2021